William Elliston, D.D. (b Debenham 13 September 1777 - d Bungay 10 October 1813) was an academic in the late eighteenth and early nineteenth centuries.

Elliston was born at Great Bardfield and educated at St John's College, Cambridge. He was a Fellow of Sidney Sussex College, Cambridge from 1758 to 1760; and Master of Sidney from 1860 until his death on 11 February 1807.  He was twice Vice-Chancellor of the University of Cambridge: from 1763 to 1764, and 1786 to 1787. Elliston was ordained a priest of the Church of England in 1759 and was Rector of Keyston from 1764 until his death.

Notes

1807 deaths
Masters of Sidney Sussex College, Cambridge
Fellows of Sidney Sussex College, Cambridge
Alumni of St John's College, Cambridge
Vice-Chancellors of the University of Cambridge
People from Essex
18th-century English Anglican priests
19th-century English Anglican priests
1777 births